Tiago Luís Caetano Pereira (born 20 June 1995) is a Portuguese footballer who plays for Varzim as a goalkeeper.

Football career
On 3 January 2016, Pereira made his professional debut with Braga B in a 2015–16 Segunda Liga match against Sporting B, winning 1–0 away. On 12 May 2018, after the team avoided relegation on the final day despite losing by the same score at the same opponents, he and opponent Pedro Delgado were sent off.

On 16 July 2019, Pereira was loaned to fellow second division team Académica de Coimbra for the upcoming season. He played eight total games, but took no part at Braga on his return, leading to him joining Varzim S.C. in June 2021.

References

External links

Stats and profile at LPFP 

1995 births
Living people
Footballers from Lisbon
Portuguese footballers
Association football goalkeepers
Liga Portugal 2 players
S.C. Braga B players
Associação Académica de Coimbra – O.A.F. players
Varzim S.C. players